La Granja (Spanish for "the farm", cf. grange, monastic grange) may refer to:

La Granja, Chile, a commune in Santiago Province, Santiago Metropolitan Region
La Granja, Spain, a municipality of Cáceres province
Royal Palace of La Granja de San Ildefonso in Spain
La Granja de San Ildefonso, the town connected to it
La granja (Chilean TV series), a 2005 Chilean reality television series
La granja (1989 TV series), a 1989–1992 Spanish soap opera television series that was broadcast by the Catalan-language channel TV3
La Granja (2004 TV series), a 2004–2005 Spanish reality television series
La Granja (album), a 2009 album by Mexican band Los Tigres del Norte
"La Granja" (song), a 2009 song by Mexican band Los Tigres del Norte

See also
Granja (disambiguation)